The EU Joint Transfer Pricing Forum (EUJTPF) was set up in 2002 from an EU communication on eliminating transfer pricing from the EU (in which it was called the "Joint Forum on Transfer Pricing"). It was to be composed of "Member States and business representatives".

The business (non-government) members of the forum (as of 6 Oct 2013) comprises 16 people  Eight of these are transfer pricing advisors (including the Chair), and eight are tax specialists in multinationals.

References

Taxation in the European Union